The Breeders' Cup Juvenile Turf is an American Thoroughbred horse race for two-year-old horses, run on a grass course at a distance of one mile. It is part of the Breeders' Cup World Championships, the de facto year-end championship for North American thoroughbred racing. All Breeders' Cups to date have been conducted in the United States, with the exception of the 1996 event in Canada.

The race was run for the first time in 2007 during the first day of the expanded Breeders' Cup at host track, Monmouth Park Racetrack in Oceanport, New Jersey. The race received Grade II status in 2009. The American Graded Stakes Committee further upgraded the race to Grade I status for 2011.

Automatic Berths 
Beginning in 2007, the Breeders' Cup developed the Breeders' Cup Challenge, a series of "Win and You're In" races that allot automatic qualifying bids to winners of defined races. Each of the fourteen divisions has multiple qualifying races. Note that one horse may win multiple challenge races, while other challenge winners will not be entered in the Breeders' Cup for a variety of reasons such as injury or travel considerations.

In the Juvenile Turf division, runners are limited to 14. The 2022 "Win and You're In" races were:
 the Juvenile Stakes, a Group 2 race run in September at Leopardstown Racecourse in  Dublin, Ireland
 the Summer Stakes, a Grade 1 race run in September at Woodbine Racetrack in Toronto, Ontario, Canada 
 the Royal Lodge Stakes, a Group 2 race run in September at Rowley Mile in Newmarket, England 
 the Prix Jean-Luc Lagardère, a Group 1 race at Longchamp Racecourse in Paris, France
 the Pilgrim Stakes, a Grade 3 race run in October at Aqueduct Racetrack in New York
 the Bourbon Stakes, a Grade 2 race run in October at Keeneland in Lexington, Kentucky

Records

Most wins by a jockey:
 5 – Ryan Moore (2011, 2012, 2015, 2017, 2022)
Most wins by a trainer:
 5 – Aidan O'Brien (2011, 2012, 2015, 2017, 2022)
Most wins by an owner:
 5 –  Mrs. John Magnier / Michael Tabor / Derrick Smith (2011, 2012, 2014, 2017, 2022)

Winners

See also 

Breeders' Cup Juvenile Turf "top three finishers" and starters
 Breeders' Cup World Thoroughbred Championships
 American thoroughbred racing top attended events

References

Racing Post:

Horse races in the United States
Flat horse races for two-year-olds
Turf races in the United States
Juvenile Turf
Grade 1 stakes races in the United States
Grade 1 turf stakes races in the United States
Graded stakes races in the United States
Recurring sporting events established in 2007
2007 establishments in the United States